Paul Muhly (born September 7, 1944) is an American mathematician. In 2015 he was elected as a Fellow of the 
American Mathematical Society for his contributions to operator theory as well as 
mentoring and service to the community.  He 
has supervised over 20 Ph.D. 
students.

References

External links
Home page

Fellows of the American Mathematical Society
20th-century American mathematicians
21st-century American mathematicians
Living people
1944 births
University of Michigan alumni